Ina Litovski is a Canadian short drama film directed by Anaïs Barbeau-Lavalette and André Turpin, released in 2012. The film stars Marine Johnson as Sophie, a young music student preparing for her school violin recital, and struggling to convince her agoraphobic mother (Geneviève Alarie) to overcome her fears and attend the performance.

The film premiered in August 2012 at the Locarno Festival. It was a Canadian Screen Award nominee for Best Live Action Short Drama at the 2nd Canadian Screen Awards in 2014.

References

External links
 

2012 short films
2012 films
Films directed by Anaïs Barbeau-Lavalette
French-language Canadian films
Canadian drama short films
2010s Canadian films